Euseius kirghisicus is a species of mite in the family Phytoseiidae.

References

kirghisicus
Articles created by Qbugbot
Animals described in 1979